is a Japanese manga written and illustrated by Masaomi Kanzaki. The manga was published in 1986 by Shogakukan and 2000 by Kodansha.  The manga was licensed by Eclipse Comics in 1987 and by Viz Communications in 1992. The manga is licensed for a French-language release in France by Génération Comics and Semic Comics, licensed for a German-language release in Germany by Planet Manga, and licensed in Taiwan by Taiwan Tohan. A 2006 sequel Xenon -199X R- was serialised in Tokuma Shoten's seinen magazine Monthly Comic Ryū.

Manga
Kodansha published the manga's 4 bound volumes between March 1986 and March 1987.

Reception

The French Manga-News regarded the first volume as "a good action manga if you like the author or the genre, but dispensable for others". While praising the art, the Manga-News reviewer felt the story was unoriginal. He felt that the "non-stop action" prevented the series from sinking into caricatures, and noted that the popularity of the manga kept the manga going into a fourth volume, and found the last volume "most interesting".

References

External links

Action anime and manga
Fantasy anime and manga
1986 manga
Science fiction anime and manga
Seinen manga
Viz Media manga